Mulla Kamal Khan or Kamalan (ملا کمال خان )  Lived (1941 – February 21, 2010). Was a Baluch folklore vocalist, he was born in 1941 in Latidan village, Dashtyari district, Chabahar County in the Sistan and Baluchistan province of Iran.  His talent was first discovered in a traditional Balochi wedding ceremony, where many Baloch tribesmen gathered to listen traditional Balochi heroic songs, he then became one of the most influential singers in Baluchistan and gained fame among all Baloch people and even by non-Balochis.

Songs 
 Hani and Sheh Mureed:  a real love story of the Mir Chakar Rind era that became a myth in Baluchistan.
 Shahdad and Mahnaz : is a story of legendary bold woman (Mahnaz) who defended her right against an adultery accusation in men-dominated society of Baluchistan.
 Dad Shah: story of  a Baluch rebel who rose against Rezah Shah Pahlavi of Iran.
 Hammal-e-Jeehand or Hammal son of Jeehand: The story of a Baluch hero who rose against Portuguese colonialists in Makran.
 Makkoran o Makkoran or o-my-Makran : is a nationalist song which admires Makran as a part of Baluchistan.

He also sang many other songs that need to be collected.

Awards 
Mulla has been admired by many non-Baluchis, Mohammad-Reza Shajarian one of the most distinguished Persian traditional musician admired him. He was awarded one of the most prestigious music prizes of Iran in 2007.

Death 
Due to Cancer, Mulla Kamalan died on 21 February 2010. Many people from around Balochistan took part in the funeral ceremony.

References 
Video 
Persian 
Wikipedia farsi

See also 
Chabahar
Baluchi music
Iranian folk music

1941 births
2010 deaths
Iranian folk singers
Baloch musicians
Baloch male singers